Lika-Senj County is a county in Croatia that includes most of the Lika region and some northern coastline of the Adriatic near the town of Senj, including the northern part of the Pag island. Its center is Gospić.

The county is the least populated (44.625 in mid-2019) and among the least prosperous ones, though it is the largest county in the country by area and includes the Plitvice Lakes National Park and Sjeverni (North) Velebit National Park, some of Croatia's major tourist attractions.

Geography 
The county has a total area of 5353 km2.

Administrative division

Lika-Senj County is administratively subdivided into 12 units of local government:

 Town of Gospić (county seat)
 Town of Novalja
 Town of Otočac 
 Town of Senj
 Municipality of Brinje
 Municipality of Donji Lapac
 Municipality of Karlobag
 Municipality of Lovinac
 Municipality of Perušić
 Municipality of Plitvička Jezera (Plitvice Lakes)
 Municipality of Udbina
 Municipality of Vrhovine

Demographics 

Since the early 20th century the county's population has been shrinking. As of the 2021 census, the county had 42.893 residents. As of 2011 census, the county had 50,927 residents. The population density is 9.5/km2.

Croatian State Bureau of Statistics estimated population of the county to stand at 45,493 in 2017, 45,184 in 2018, and 44,625 in 2019.

Ethnic composition

Ethnic Croats form the majority with 84.15% of the population, followed by Serbs at 13.65%. Serbs form majority in municipalities of Vrhovine, Donji Lapac, and Udbina.

In 1991, before the outbreak of the Croatian War of Independence and the Breakup of Yugoslavia, Croats comprised 59.7% of the population, while Serbs comprised 37%. The area of the county used to have a significant Serb population, mostly located in the eastern part of the county, where they formed a majority. The entire former Lika-Krbava County, loosely overlapping with the area of the modern Lika-Senj county, in censuses of 1900 and 1910 even registered Serb majority (51.2% and 50.8%, respectively).

County government
The current Prefect of Lika-Senj County is Ernest Petry (HDZ).

The county assembly is composed of 27 representatives from the following political parties:

See also
Lika-Krbava County of the Kingdom of Croatia-Slavonia
Morlachia, an historical region in Europe largely located in the modern Lika-Senj County

References

External links

 

 
Counties of Croatia